The Renaissance Kuala Lumpur Hotel is a hotel that belongs to Marriott Group and comprises two wings which are very distinct in its design. There is an underground tributary of the Gombak river running its course under the East wing. The Renaissance Kuala Lumpur Hotel also houses the Mandara Spa.

See also
Marriott International
JW Marriott Hotels
Marriott India

External links

Renaissance Kuala Lumpur Hotel

Hotels in Kuala Lumpur
Hotel buildings completed in 1996